Jamesia globifera is a species of beetle in the family Cerambycidae. It was described by Johan Christian Fabricius in 1801. It is known from Costa Rica, Brazil, Bolivia, Colombia, Panama, French Guiana, Nicaragua, Ecuador, Peru, Suriname, Guyana, and Venezuela.

References

Onciderini
Beetles described in 1801